Grand Ayatullah Qorban Ali Mohaqiq Kabuli (Persian: آیت‌الله العظمى قربان على محقق كابلى) was a Twelver Shia Marja' in Afghanistan. He was an ethnic Hazara.

Biography

Early life
He was born in the village of Turkman in Parwan in north west of Kabul.
He started basic religious schooling, at the age of seven, by learning Koran and religion related books in Persian language. He got involved deep in Islamic beliefs, literature, logic, jurisprudence and sciences after he joined local religious schools. Later, he went to Kabul where educational resources were limited and the political situation was not ideal, either. Then, for further studies, he left Afghanistan for Iran. In the Solar year 1332, he went to Najaf Iraq to study.

Life in Najaf

His higher education started in 1332 (solar) in Najaf, his teachers were Ayatullah Abdul Ali Sabzevari, Sheikh Kazim Tabrezi, Sayed Abdul Hussein Rashti, Mohammad Taqi Al-Razi, Late Sheikh Sadra, and Late Sheik Mujtaba Talmaz. He also attended lectures of Imam Khomeini. In 1334 (Solar) his teachers were Ayatullah Khoi and Ayatullah Sheikh Mohammad Baqir Zanjani.

Return to Afghanistan

After completing his education he returned to Afghanistan in 1973, where he was welcomed by thousands of people on his arrival.

Death

He died on June 11, 2019 at the age of 91.

References

Afghan grand ayatollahs
Afghan Shia Muslims
Hazara people
1928 births
2019 deaths
People from Parwan Province
Hazara religious leaders
20th-century Islamic religious leaders
21st-century Islamic religious leaders